Endotricha coreacealis is a species of snout moth in the genus Endotricha. It was described by Arnold Pagenstecher in 1884, and is known from Amboina and New Guinea.

References

Endotrichini
Moths described in 1884